The Avrutch branch of the Chabad Hasidic movement was founded after the death of the third rebbe of Chabad, Rabbi Menachem Mendel Schneersohn. The group was one of several groups that sought to succeed Rabbi Menachem Mendel, whose death created a dispute over his succession. The group was led by its founder, Rabbi Yosef Yitzchak of Avrutch, a son of Rabbi Menachem Mendel, who assumed the role of rebbe in the town of Ovruch. Rabbi Yosef Yitzchak died without a successor, thus ending the Avrutch dynasty.

References 

Hasidic dynasties
Chabad-Lubavitch related controversies